Ducor is a census-designated place (CDP) in Tulare County, California, United States. The population was 612 at the 2010 census, up from 504 at the 2000 census. Ducor is an abbreviation of an earlier name, Dutch Corners, which was given because several early settler families were German. The word "Dutch" in this case derives from German  "German".

Geography
Ducor is located at  (35.892176, -119.048079).

Demographics

2010
The 2010 United States Census reported that Ducor had a population of 612. The racial makeup of Ducor was 251 (41.0%) White, 0 (0.0%) African American, 15 (2.5%) Native American, 20 (3.3%) Asian, 0 (0.0%) Pacific Islander, 302 (49.3%) from other races, and 24 (3.9%) from two or more races. Hispanic or Latino of any race were 502 persons (82.0%).

The Census reported that 612 people (100% of the population) lived in households, 0 (0%) lived in non-institutionalized group quarters, and 0 (0%) were institutionalized.

There were 142 households, out of which 89 (62.7%) had children under the age of 18 living in them, 103 (72.5%) were opposite-sex married couples living together, 13 (9.2%) had a female householder with no husband present, 16 (11.3%) had a male householder with no wife present.  There were 12 (8.5%) unmarried opposite-sex partnerships, and 1 (0.7%) same-sex married couples or partnerships. 6 households (4.2%) were made up of individuals, and 1 (0.7%) had someone living alone who was 65 years of age or older. The average household size was 4.31.  There were 132 families (93.0% of all households); the average family size was 4.40.

The population was spread out, with 200 people (32.7%) under the age of 18, 90 people (14.7%) aged 18 to 24, 135 people (22.1%) aged 25 to 44, 136 people (22.2%) aged 45 to 64, and 51 people (8.3%) who were 65 years of age or older.  The median age was 27.6 years. For every 100 females, there were 104.0 males.  For every 100 females age 18 and over, there were 113.5 males.

The homeowner vacancy rate was 0.9%; the rental vacancy rate was 11.9%.  434 people (70.9% of the population) lived in owner-occupied housing units and 178 people (29.1%) lived in rental housing units.

2000
As of the census of 2000, there were 504 people, 120 households, and 101 families residing in the CDP. The racial makeup of the CDP was 34.33% White, 0.20% African American, 0.40% Native American, 1.59% Asian, 61.11% from other races, and 2.38% from two or more races. Hispanic or Latino of any race were 72.62% of the population.

There were 120 households, out of which 46.7% had children under the age of 18 living with them, 66.7% were married couples living together, 9.2% had a female householder with no husband present, and 15.8% were non-families. 12.5% of all households were made up of individuals, and 5.0% had someone living alone who was 65 years of age or older.  The average household size was 4.18 and the average family size was 4.58.

In the CDP, the population was spread out, with 39.3% under the age of 18, 11.3% from 18 to 24, 26.2% from 25 to 44, 17.7% from 45 to 64, and 5.6% who were 65 years of age or older.  The median age was 25 years. For every 100 females, there were 119.1 males.  For every 100 females age 18 and over, there were 115.5 males.

The median income for a household in the CDP was $33,125, and the median income for a family was $30,694. Males had a median income of $33,750 versus $26,250 for females. The per capita income for the CDP was $9,701.  About 24.8% of families and 30.0% of the population were below the poverty line, including 37.1% of those under age 18 and 13.8% of those age 65 or over.

Government

Ducor Union Elementary School District services the students in Ducor, CA. The District website is located at www.ducorschool.com

References

Census-designated places in Tulare County, California
Census-designated places in California